Fever of unknown origin (FUO) refers to a condition in which the patient has an elevated temperature (fever) but, despite investigations by a physician, no explanation is found.

If the cause is found it is usually a diagnosis of exclusion, eliminating all possibilities until only the correct explanation remains.

Causes
Worldwide, infection is the leading cause of FUO with prevalence varying by country and geographic region. Extrapulmonary tuberculosis is the most frequent cause of FUO.
Drug-induced hyperthermia, as the sole symptom of an adverse drug reaction, should always be considered. Disseminated granulomatoses such as tuberculosis, histoplasmosis, coccidioidomycosis, blastomycosis and sarcoidosis are associated with FUO. Lymphomas are the most common cause of FUO in adults. Thromboembolic disease (i.e. pulmonary embolism, deep venous thrombosis) occasionally shows fever. Although infrequent, its potentially lethal consequences warrant evaluation of this cause. Endocarditis, although uncommon, is possible. Bartonella infections are also known to cause fever of unknown origin.

Human herpes viruses are a common cause of fever of unknown origin with one study showing Cytomegalovirus, Epstein–Barr virus, human herpesvirus 6 (HHV-6), human herpesvirus 7 (HHV-7) being present in 15%, 10%, 14% and 4.8% respectively with 10% of people presenting with co-infection (infection with two or more human herpes viruses). Infectious mononucleosis, most commonly caused by EBV, may present as a fever of unknown origin. Other symptoms of infectious mononucleosis vary with age with middle aged adults and the elderly more likely to have a longer duration of fever and leukopenia, and younger adults and adolescents more likely to have splenomegaly, pharyngitis and lymphadenopathy.

Endemic mycoses such as histoplasmosis, blastomycosis, coccidiomycosis and paracoccidioidomycosis can cause a fever of unknown origin in immunocompromised as well as immunocompetent people. These endemic mycoses may also present with pulmonary symptoms or extra-pulmonary symptoms such as B symptoms (such as fevers, chills, night sweats, unexplained weight loss). The endemic mycotic infection talaromycosis primarily affects those who are immunocompromised. Invasive opportunistic mycoses may also occur in immunocompromised people; these include aspergillosis, mucormycosis, Cryptococcus neoformans.

Cancer can also cause fever of unknown origin. This is thought to be due to release of pyrogenic cytokines from cancer cells as well as due to spontaneous tumor necrosis (sometimes with secondary infections). The cancer types most associated with fever of unknown origin include renal cell carcinoma, lymphoma, liver cancer, ovarian cancer atrial myxoma and Castleman disease.

In those with HIV currently being treated with antiretroviral therapy and with a low or undetectable viral load; causes of fever of unknown origin are usually not associated with HIV infection. But in those with AIDS, with high viral loads, viral replication and immune-compromise; cancers  and opportunistic infection are the most common cause of FUO. Approximately 2 weeks after initial HIV infection, with viral loads being high, an acute retroviral syndrome can present with fevers, rash and mono-like symptoms. 

Immune reconstitution inflammatory syndrome is a common cause of FUO when a previously suppressed immune system is re-activated. The newly active immune system often has an exaggerated response against opportunistic pathogens leading to a fever and other inflammatory symptoms. Immune reconstitution syndrome commonly presents as after microbiological control of infection (in cases of immune suppressing pathogens such as HIV) but the syndrome may also present after organ transplant, in the post-partum state, with formerly neutropenic hosts or withdrawing anti-TNF therapy.

Auto-inflammatory and auto-immune disorders account for approximately 5-32% of fevers of unknown origin. These can be classified as purely auto-inflammatory disorders (disorders of innate immunity, with dysregulated interleukin 1 beta and/or IL-18 responses), purely auto-immune disorders (in which the adaptive immunity is dysregulated, with a dysregulated type 1 interferon response) or disorders with mixed features. Rheumatoid arthritis or adult-onset Still's disease have mixed features and are common causes of FUO.

Infection

Neoplasm
Although most neoplasms can present with fever, malignant lymphoma is by far the most common diagnosis of FUO among the neoplasms. In some cases the fever even precedes lymphadenopathy detectable by physical examination.

Noninfectious inflammatory diseases

Miscellaneous conditions

 ADEM (acute disseminated encephalomyelitis)
 Adrenal insufficiency
 Aneurysm
 Anomalous thoracic duct
 Aortic dissection
 Aortic-enteral fistula
 Aseptic meningitis (Mollaret’s syndrome)
 Atrial myxoma
 Brewer’s yeast ingestion
 Caroli disease
 Cholesterol emboli
 Complex partial status epilepticus
 Cyclic neutropenia
 Drug fever
 Erdheim–Chester disease
 Extrinsic allergic alveolitis
 Factitious disease
 Fire-eater’s lung
 Fraudulent fever
 Gaucher’s disease
 Hamman–Rich syndrome (acute interstitial pneumonia)
 Hashimoto’s encephalopathy
 Hematomas
 Hemoglobinopathies
 Hypersensitivity pneumonitis
 Hypertriglyceridemia
 Hypothalamic hypopituitarism
 Idiopathic normal-pressure hydrocephalus
 Inflammatory pseudotumor
 Kikuchi’s disease
 Linear IgA dermatosis
 Laennec's cirrhosis
 Mesenteric fibromatosis
 Metal fume fever
 Milk protein allergy
 Myotonic dystrophy
 Nonbacterial osteitis
 Organic dust toxic syndrome
 Panniculitis
 POEMS (polyneuropathy, organomegaly, endocrinopathy, monoclonal protein, skin changes)
 Polymer fume fever
 Post–cardiac injury syndrome
 Postmyocardial infarction syndrome
 Primary biliary cirrhosis 
 Primary hyperparathyroidism
 Recurrent pulmonary emboli
 Pyoderma gangrenosum
 Retroperitoneal fibrosis 
 Rosai-Dorfman disease
 Sclerosing mesenteritis
 Silicone embolization
 Subacute thyroiditis (de Quervain's)
 Sweet syndrome (acute febrile neutrophilic dermatosis)
 Thrombosis
 Tubulointerstitial nephritis and uveitis syndrome (TINU)
 Tissue infarction/necrosis
 Ulcerative colitis

Inherited and metabolic diseases

 Adrenal insufficiency
 Cyclic neutropenia
 Deafness, urticaria, and amyloidosis
 Fabry disease
 Familial cold urticaria
 Familial Mediterranean fever
 Hyperimmunoglobulinemia D and periodic fever
 Muckle–Wells syndrome
 Tumor necrosis factor receptor–associated periodic syndrome (familial Hibernian fever)
 Type V Hypertriglyceridemia

Thermoregulatory disorders

Habitual hyperthermia
 Exaggerated circadian rhythm

Other
 “Afebrile” FUO [<38.3 °C (100.9 °F)]

Diagnosis
A comprehensive and meticulous history (i.e. illness of family members, recent visit to the tropics, medication), repeated physical examination (i.e. skin rash, eschar, lymphadenopathy, heart murmur) and myriad laboratory tests (serological, blood culture, immunological) are the cornerstone of finding the cause.

Other investigations may be needed. Ultrasound may show cholelithiasis, echocardiography may be needed in suspected endocarditis and a CT-scan may show infection or malignancy of internal organs. Another technique is Gallium-67 scanning which seems to visualize chronic infections more effectively. Invasive techniques (biopsy and laparotomy for pathological and bacteriological examination) may be required before a definite diagnosis is possible.

Positron emission tomography using radioactively labelled fluorodeoxyglucose (FDG) has been reported to have a sensitivity of 84% and a specificity of 86% for localizing the source of fever of unknown origin.

Despite all this, diagnosis may only be suggested by the therapy chosen. When a patient recovers after discontinuing medication it likely was drug fever, when antibiotics or antimycotics work it probably was infection. Empirical therapeutic trials should be used in those patients in which other techniques have failed.

Definition
There is no universal agreement with regards to time criteria or other diagnostic criteria to diagnose a fever of unknown origin and various definitions have been used.

In 1961 Petersdorf and Beeson suggested the following criteria:
 Fever higher than 38.3 °C (101 °F) on several occasions
 Persisting without diagnosis for at least 3 weeks
 At least 1 week's investigation in hospital

A new definition which includes the outpatient setting (which reflects current medical practice) is broader, stipulating:
 3 outpatient visits or
 3 days in the hospital without elucidation of a cause or
 1 week of "intelligent and invasive" ambulatory investigation.

Presently FUO cases are codified in four subclasses.

Classic
This refers to the original classification by Petersdorf and Beeson. Studies show there are five categories of conditions:
 infections (e.g.  abscesses, endocarditis, tuberculosis, and complicated urinary tract infections),
 neoplasms (e.g. lymphomas, leukaemias),
 connective tissue diseases (e.g. temporal arteritis and polymyalgia rheumatica, Still's disease, systemic lupus erythematosus, and rheumatoid arthritis),
 miscellaneous disorders (e.g.  alcoholic hepatitis, granulomatous conditions), and
 undiagnosed conditions.

Nosocomial
Nosocomial FUO refers to pyrexia in patients that have been admitted to hospital for at least 24 hours. This is commonly related to hospital-associated factors such as surgery, use of a urinary catheter, intravascular devices (i.e. "drip", pulmonary artery catheter), drugs (antibiotic-induced Clostridium difficile colitis, drug fever), and/or immobilization (decubitus ulcers). Sinusitis in the intensive care unit is associated with nasogastric and orotracheal tubes. Other conditions that should be considered are deep-vein thrombophlebitis, pulmonary embolism, transfusion reactions, acalculous cholecystitis, thyroiditis, alcohol/drug withdrawal, adrenal insufficiency, and pancreatitis.

Immune-deficient
Immunodeficiency can be seen in patients receiving chemotherapy or in hematologic malignancies. Fever is concomitant with neutropenia (neutrophil <500/uL) or impaired cell-mediated immunity. The lack of immune response masks a potentially dangerous course. Infection is the most common cause.

Human immunodeficiency virus (HIV)-associated

HIV-infected patients are a subgroup of the immunodeficient FUO, and frequently have fever. The primary phase shows fever since it has a mononucleosis-like illness. In advanced stages of infection fever mostly is the result of a superimposed infections.

Treatment
Unless the patient is acutely ill, no therapy should be started before the cause has been found. This is because non-specific therapy is rarely effective and may delay the diagnosis. An exception is made for neutropenic (low white blood cell count) patients or patients who are severely immunocompromised in which delay could lead to serious complications. After blood cultures are taken this condition is aggressively treated with broad-spectrum antibiotics. Antibiotics are adjusted according to the results of the cultures taken.

HIV-infected people with pyrexia and hypoxia will be started on medication for possible Pneumocystis jirovecii infection. Therapy is adjusted after a diagnosis is made.

Prognosis
Since there is a wide range of conditions associated with FUO, prognosis depends on the particular cause. If after six to twelve months no diagnosis is found, the chances of ever finding a specific cause diminish. Under those circumstances, the prognosis is good.

References

External links 

Infectious diseases
Fever
Ailments of unknown cause